Arndt von Bohlen und Halbach (24 January 1938 – 8 May 1986) was a German heir of the Krupp dynasty.

Biography 
The son of Alfried Krupp von Bohlen und Halbach (1907–1967) and Anneliese (nee Bahr) Lampert (1909–1998) (married 1937 – divorced 1941); Arndt von Bohlen, Lutheran by birth and tradition, famously waived his inheritance in 1966 and thus was no longer the owner of the company Friedrich Krupp AG. Instead, his father created the Alfried Krupp von Bohlen und Halbach Foundation. However, Arndt agreed with receiving a yearly appanage of 2 million DM. Because he waived his inheritance, he was also not allowed to use the family name Krupp, which was reserved to the sole inheritor of the family business.

Marriage and later life 
Despite being notoriously homosexual, like his great-grandfather Friedrich Alfred Krupp, on 14 February 1969, he married Princess Henriette von Auersperg, the daughter of Prince Alois von Auersperg (1897–1984) and Countess Henriette Marie Louise Larisch von Moennich (1902–1994). The couple had no children.
Owing to generous compensation and appanage, Arndt was able to live the jet-set life, flying constantly between Miami and Marrakesh. In 1982, he converted from Lutheran Protestantism to the Roman Catholic faith.

Ironically, also like his great-grandfather, he died at the age of 48 in the Klinikum Großhadern in Munich of jaw cancer. He had been an alcoholic for a long time and was deeply in debt at the time of his death.

In his book LIFE, Keith Richards stated that Arndt was a regular party companion in Marrakesh.

Literature 
 Kammertöns, Hanns-Bruno (1998) Der letzte Krupp (in German). Hamburg: Hoffmann & Campe.

Media 
Bernard Baumgarten (choreographer): Pseudo-Krupp, ein Tanzstück. Date of premiere: October 2, 2001 at the Theatre d’Esch in Esch-sur-Alzette, Luxembourg.
Luchino Visconti (director): The Damned, movie 1969, with Helmut Berger as "Martin von Essenbeck". His character is based on Arndt von Bohlen und Halbach. The screenplay was nominated for an Oscar in 1970.
Carlo Rola (director): . (German miniseries) Nikolai Kinski plays the young Arndt von Bohlen-Halbach.

External links
Literature by and about Arndt von Bohlen und Halbach in the German National Library

References 

  

1938 births
1986 deaths
German untitled nobility
LGBT nobility
Krupp family
German LGBT businesspeople
Converts to Roman Catholicism from Lutheranism
20th-century German LGBT people